United Nations Security Council Resolution 185 was adopted unanimously on December 16, 1963. After examining the application of Kenya for membership in the United Nations, the Council recommended to the General Assembly that Kenya be admitted.

See also
List of United Nations Security Council Resolutions 101 to 200 (1953–1965)

References
Text of the Resolution at undocs.org

External links
 

 0185
 0185
 0185
1963 in Kenya
December 1963 events